Leslie Howard Steiner (3 April 18931 June 1943) was an English actor, director and  producer. He wrote many stories and articles for The New York Times, The New Yorker, and Vanity Fair and was one of the biggest box-office draws and movie idols of the 1930s.

Active in both Britain and Hollywood, Howard played  Ashley Wilkes in Gone with the Wind (1939). He had roles in many other films, often playing the quintessential Englishman, including Berkeley Square (1933), Of Human Bondage (1934), The Scarlet Pimpernel (1934), The Petrified Forest (1936), Pygmalion (1938), Intermezzo (1939), "Pimpernel" Smith (1941), and The First of the Few (1942). He was nominated for the Academy Award for Best Actor for Berkeley Square and Pygmalion.

Howard's World War II activities included acting and filmmaking. He helped to make anti-German propaganda and shore up support for the Allies—two years after his death the British Film Yearbook described Howard's work as "one of the most valuable facets of British propaganda". He was rumoured to have been involved with British or Allied Intelligence, sparking conspiracy theories regarding his death in 1943 when the Luftwaffe shot down BOAC Flight 777 over the Atlantic (off the coast of Cedeira, A Coruña), on which he was a passenger.

Early life

Howard was born Leslie Howard Steiner to a British mother, Lilian (née Blumberg), and a Hungarian-Jewish father, Ferdinand Steiner, in Upper Norwood, London. His younger brother was actor Arthur Howard. Lilian had been raised as a Christian, but she was of partial Jewish ancestry—her paternal grandfather Ludwig Blumberg, a Jewish merchant originally from East Prussia, had married into the English upper-middle classes.

He received his formal education at Alleyn's School, London. Like many others around the time of the First World War, the family anglicised its name, in this case to "Stainer", although Howard's name remained Steiner in official documents, such as his military records.

He was a 21-year-old bank clerk in Dulwich when the First World War began; in September 1914 he voluntarily enlisted (under the name Leslie Howard Steiner) as a Private with the British Army's Inns of Court Officer Training Corps in London. In February 1915 he received a commission as a subaltern with the 3/1st Northamptonshire Yeomanry, with which he trained in England until 19 May 1916, when he resigned his commission and was medically discharged from the British Army with neurasthenia.

In March 1920, Howard gave public notice in The London Gazette that he had  changed his surname, and would thereafter be known by the name of Howard instead of Steiner.

Theatre career

Howard began his professional acting career in regional tours of Peg O' My Heart and Charley's Aunt in 1916–17 and on the London stage in 1917, but had his greatest theatrical success in the United States in Broadway theatre, in plays such as Aren't We All? (1923), Outward Bound (1924) and The Green Hat (1925). He became an undisputed Broadway star in Her Cardboard Lover (1927). After his success as time traveller Peter Standish in Berkeley Square (1929), Howard launched his Hollywood career in the film version of Outward Bound, but didn't like the experience and vowed never to return to Hollywood. However, he did return, many times—later repeating the Standish role in the 1933 film version of Berkeley Square.

The stage, however, continued to be an important part of his career. Howard frequently juggled acting, producing and directing duties in the Broadway productions in which he starred. Howard was also a dramatist, and starred in the Broadway production of his own play Murray Hill (1927). He played Matt Denant in John Galsworthy's 1927 Broadway production Escape in which he first made his mark as a dramatic actor. His stage triumphs continued with The Animal Kingdom (1932) and The Petrified Forest (1936). He later repeated both roles in the film versions.

Howard loved to play Shakespeare, but according to producer John Houseman he could be lazy about learning lines. He first sprang to fame playing in Romeo and Juliet (1936) in the role of the leading man. During the same period he had the misfortune to open on Broadway in Hamlet (1936) just a few weeks after John Gielgud launched a rival production of the same play that was far more successful with both critics and audiences. Howard's production, his final stage role, lasted for only 39 performances before closing.

Howard was inducted into the American Theatre Hall of Fame in 1981.

Film career

In 1920 Howard suggested forming a film production company, British Comedy Films Ltd., to his friend Adrian Brunel. The two eventually settled on the name Minerva Films Ltd. The company's board of directors consisted of Howard, Brunel, C. Aubrey Smith, Nigel Playfair and A. A. Milne. One of the company's investors was H. G. Wells. Although the films produced by Minerva—which were written by A. A. Milne—were well received by critics, the company was only offered £200 apiece for films it cost them £1,000 to produce and Minerva Films Ltd. was short-lived. Early films include four written by A. A. Milne, including The Bump, starring C. Aubrey Smith; Twice Two; Five Pounds Reward; and Bookworms, the latter two starring Howard. Some of these films survive in the archives of the British Film Institute.

In British and Hollywood productions, Howard often played stiff upper lipped Englishmen. He appeared in the film version of Outward Bound (1930), though in a different role from the one he portrayed on Broadway. He had second billing under Norma Shearer in A Free Soul (1931), which also featured Lionel Barrymore and future Gone With the Wind rival Clark Gable eight years prior to their Civil War masterpiece. He starred in the film version of Berkeley Square (1933), for which he was nominated for an Academy Award for Best Actor. He played the title role in The Scarlet Pimpernel (1934), which is often considered the definitive portrayal.

When Howard co-starred with Bette Davis in The Petrified Forest (1936) – having earlier co-starred with her in the film adaptation of W. Somerset Maugham's book Of Human Bondage (1934) – he reportedly insisted that Humphrey Bogart play gangster Duke Mantee, repeating his role from the stage production. This re-launched Bogart's screen career, and the two men became lifelong friends; Bogart and Lauren Bacall later named their daughter "Leslie Howard Bogart" after him. In the same year Howard starred with Norma Shearer in a film version of Shakespeare's Romeo and Juliet (1936).

Davis was again Howard's co-star in the romantic comedy It's Love I'm After (1937) (also co-starring Olivia de Havilland). He played Professor Henry Higgins in the film version of George Bernard Shaw's play Pygmalion (1938), with Wendy Hiller as Eliza, which earned Howard another Academy Award nomination for Best Actor. In 1939, as war approached, he played opposite Ingrid Bergman in Intermezzo; that August, Howard was determined to return to the country of his birth. He was eager to help the war effort, but lost any support for a new film, instead being obliged to relinquish £20,000 of holdings in the US before he could leave the country.

Howard is perhaps best remembered for his role as Ashley Wilkes in Gone with the Wind (1939), his last American film, but he was uncomfortable with Hollywood, and returned to Britain to help with the Second World War effort. He starred in a number of Second World War films including 49th Parallel (1941), "Pimpernel" Smith (1941) and The First of the Few (1942, known in the U.S. as Spitfire), the latter two of which he also directed and co-produced. His friend and The First of the Few co-star David Niven said Howard was "...not what he seemed. He had the kind of distraught air that would make people want to mother him. Actually, he was about as naïve as General Motors. Busy little brain, always going."

In 1944, after his death, British exhibitors voted him the second-most popular local star at the box office. His daughter said he was a "remarkable man".

Personal life
Howard married Ruth Evelyn Martin (1895–1980) in March, 1916, and their children Ronald "Winkie" and Leslie Ruth "Doodie" who appeared with her father and David Niven in the film The First of the Few (1942), playing the role of nurse to David Niven's character, and as a major contributor in the filmed biography of her father, Leslie Howard: The Man Who Gave a Damn. His son became an actor and played the title role in the television series Sherlock Holmes (1954). His younger brother Arthur was also an actor, primarily in British comedies. His sister Irene was a costume designer and a casting director for Metro-Goldwyn-Mayer. His sister Doris Stainer founded the Hurst Lodge School in Sunningdale, Berkshire, in 1945 and remained its headmistress until the 1970s.

Howard was widely known as a "ladies' man", and he once said that he "didn't chase women but … couldn't always be bothered to run away". He reportedly had affairs with Tallulah Bankhead when they appeared on stage in the UK in Her Cardboard Lover (1927), with Merle Oberon while filming The Scarlet Pimpernel (1934), and with Conchita Montenegro, with whom he had appeared in the film Never the Twain Shall Meet (1931). There were also rumours of affairs with Norma Shearer and Myrna Loy during filming of The Animal Kingdom. Howard reportedly fathered a daughter - Carol Grace, born 1924 - by Rosheen Marcus; Carol married writer William Saroyan and then actor Walter Matthau.

Howard fell in love with Violette Cunnington in 1938 while working on Pygmalion. She was secretary to Gabriel Pascal who was producing the film; she became Howard's secretary and lover, and they travelled to the United States and lived together while he was filming Gone with the Wind and Intermezzo (both 1939). His wife and daughter joined him in Hollywood before production ended on the two films, making his arrangement with Cunnington somewhat uncomfortable for everyone. He left the United States for the last time with his wife and daughter in August, 1939, and Cunnington soon followed. She appeared in "Pimpernel" Smith (1941) and The First of the Few (1942) in minor roles under the stage name of Suzanne Clair. She died of pneumonia in her early thirties in 1942, just six months before Howard's death. Howard left her his Beverly Hills house in his will.

The Howard family's home in Britain was Stowe Maries, a 16th-century, six-bedroom farmhouse on the edge of Westcott, Surrey. An English Heritage blue plaque was placed at 45 Farquhar Road, Upper Norwood, London in 2013.

Death

In May 1943, Howard travelled to Portugal to promote the British cause. He stayed in Monte Estoril, at the Hotel Atlântico, between 1 May and 4 May, then again between 8 May and 10 May and again between 25 May and 31 May 1943. The following day, 1 June 1943, he was aboard KLM Royal Dutch Airlines/BOAC Flight 777, "G-AGBB" a Douglas DC-3 flying from Lisbon to Bristol, when it was shot down by Luftwaffe Junkers Ju 88 C-6 maritime fighter aircraft over the Atlantic (off Cedeira, A Coruña). He was among the 17 fatalities, including four KLM flight crew.

The BOAC DC-3 Ibis had been operating on a scheduled Lisbon–Whitchurch route throughout 1942–43 that did not pass over what would commonly be referred to as a war zone. By 1942, however, the Germans considered the region an "extremely sensitive war zone". On two occasions, 15 November 1942 and 19 April 1943, the camouflaged airliner had been attacked by Messerschmitt Bf 110 fighters (a single aircraft and six Bf 110s, respectively) whilst en route; each time, the pilots escaped via evasive tactics.

On 1 June 1943, "G-AGBB" again came under attack by a swarm of eight V/KG40 Ju 88 C-6 maritime fighters. The DC-3's last radio message indicated it was being fired upon at longitude 09.37 West, latitude 46.54 North.

Luftwaffe records indicate that the Ju 88 maritime fighters were operating beyond their normal patrol area to intercept and shoot down the aircraft. First Oberleutnant Herbert Hintze, Staffelkapitän of 14 Staffel, V./Kampfgeschwader 40, and based in Bordeaux, stated that his Staffel shot down the DC-3 because it was recognized as an enemy aircraft.

Hintze further stated that his pilots were angry that the Luftwaffe leaders had not informed them of a scheduled flight between Lisbon and the UK, and that had they known, they could easily have escorted the DC-3 to Bordeaux and captured it and all aboard. The German pilots photographed the wreckage floating in the Bay of Biscay, and after the war, copies of these captured photographs were sent to Howard's family.

The following day, a search of the waters on the route was undertaken by "N/461", a Short Sunderland flying boat from No. 461 Squadron RAAF. Near the same coordinates where the DC-3 was shot down, the Sunderland was attacked by eight Ju 88s and, after a furious battle, it managed to shoot down three of the attackers, with an additional three "possibles", before crash-landing at Praa Sands near Penzance. In the aftermath of these two actions, all BOAC flights from Lisbon were re-routed and operated only under the cover of darkness.

The news of Howard's death was published in the same issue of The Times that reported the "death" of Major William Martin, the “Man who never was” created for the ruse involved in Operation Mincemeat.

Theories regarding the air attack

A long-standing but ultimately unsupported hypothesis suggested that the Germans believed that the British Prime Minister, Winston Churchill, was on board the flight. Churchill's history of World War II suggested that the Germans targeted the commercial flight because the British Prime Minister's "presence in North Africa [for the 1943 Casablanca conference] had been fully reported", and German agents at the Lisbon airfield mistook a "thickset man smoking a cigar" boarding the plane for Churchill returning to England. The death of the fourteen civilians including Leslie Howard "was a painful shock to me", Churchill wrote; "the brutality of the Germans was only matched by the stupidity of their agents".

Two books focusing on the final flight, Flight 777 (Ian Colvin, 1957) and In Search of My Father: A Portrait of Leslie Howard (Ronald Howard, 1984), asserted that the target was Howard instead: that Germans deliberately shot down Howard's DC-3 to demoralise Britain. Howard had been travelling through Spain and Portugal lecturing on film, but also meeting with local propagandists and shoring up support for the Allies. The British Film Yearbook for 1945 described Leslie Howard's work as "one of the most valuable facets of British propaganda".

The Germans could have suspected even more surreptitious activities, since Portugal, like Switzerland, was a crossroads for internationals and spies from both sides. British historian James Oglethorpe investigated Howard's connection to the secret services. Ronald Howard's book explores the written German orders to the Ju 88 squadron in great detail, as well as British communiqués that purportedly verify intelligence reports indicating a deliberate attack on Howard. These accounts indicate that the Germans were aware of Churchill's real whereabouts at the time and were not so naïve as to believe he would be travelling alone on board an unescorted, unarmed civilian aircraft, which Churchill also acknowledged as improbable. Ronald Howard was convinced the order to shoot down Howard's airliner came directly from Joseph Goebbels, Minister of Public Enlightenment and Propaganda in Nazi Germany, who had been ridiculed in one of Leslie Howard's films, and believed Howard to be the most dangerous British propagandist.

Most of the 13 passengers were either British businessmen with commercial connections to Portugal, or lower-ranking British government civil servants. There were also two or three children of British military personnel. Two passengers were bumped off the flight, George and William Cecil, the teenage sons of Cornelia Stuyvesant Vanderbilt, who had been recalled to London from their Swiss boarding school, thus saving their lives.

A 2008 book by Spanish writer José Rey Ximena argues that Howard was on a top-secret mission for Churchill to dissuade Spanish dictator Francisco Franco from joining the Axis powers. Via an old girlfriend, Conchita Montenegro, Howard had contacts with Ricardo Giménez Arnau, a young diplomat in the Spanish Ministry of Foreign Affairs.

Further merely circumstantial background evidence is revealed in Jimmy Burns's 2009 biography of his father, spymaster Tom Burns. According to author William Stevenson in A Man called Intrepid, his biography of Sir William Samuel Stephenson (no relation), the senior representative of British Intelligence for the western hemisphere during the Second World War, Stephenson postulated that the Germans knew about Howard's mission and ordered the aircraft shot down. Stephenson further argued that Churchill knew in advance of the German intention to shoot down the aircraft, but allowed it to proceed to protect the fact that the British had broken the German Enigma code. Former CIA agent Joseph B. Smith recalled that, in 1957, he was briefed by the National Security Agency on the need for secrecy and that Leslie Howard's death had been brought up. The NSA stated that Howard knew his aircraft was to be attacked by German fighters and sacrificed himself to protect the British code-breakers.

A secretly taped account by one of the pilots involved appears in Sönke Neitzel and Harald Welzer's Soldiers: German POWs on Fighting, Killing, and Dying. In a recently declassified transcript of a surreptitiously recorded conversation by two German Luftwaffe prisoners of war talking about the shooting down of Howard's flight, one seems to express pride in his accomplishment, but states clearly he knew nothing of the passenger's identities or importance until hearing an English broadcast later that evening. Asked why he shot down a civil aircraft, he states it was one of four such planes he shot down: "Whatever crossed our path was shot down."

The 2010 biography by Estel Eforgan, Leslie Howard: The Lost Actor, examines then recently available evidence and concludes that Howard was not a specific target, corroborating the statements by German sources that the shootdown was "an error in judgement".

There is a monument in San Andrés de Teixido, Spain, dedicated to the victims of the crash. Howard's aircraft was shot down over the sea north of this village.

The Mystery of Flight 777 (documentary) 
The Mystery of Flight 777, by film-maker Thomas Hamilton, explores the circumstances, theories and myths which have grown around the shooting down of Howard's plane. The film also aims to examine in detail some of the other passengers on board. Originally intended as a short companion piece to the Leslie Howard film, this project expanded in scope and as of January 2021 is still in production.

Biographies
Howard's premature death preempted any autobiography. A compilation of his writings, Trivial Fond Records, edited and with occasional comments by his son Ronald, was published in 1982. This book includes insights on his family life, first impressions of America and Americans when he first moved to the United States to act on Broadway, and his views on democracy in the years prior to and during the Second World War.

Howard's son and daughter each published memoirs of their father: In Search of My Father: A Portrait of Leslie Howard (1984) by Ronald Howard, and A Quite Remarkable Father: A Biography of Leslie Howard (1959) by Leslie Ruth Howard.

Estel Eforgan's Leslie Howard: The Lost Actor is a full-length book biography published in 2010.

Leslie Howard: The Man Who Gave a Damn
Leslie Howard: A Quite Remarkable Life, a film documentary biography produced by Thomas Hamilton of Repo Films, was shown privately at the NFB Mediatheque, Toronto, Canada in September 2009 for contributors and supporters of the film. Subsequently, re-edited and retitled Leslie Howard: The Man Who Gave a Damn, the documentary was officially launched on 2 September 2011 in an event held at Howard's former home "Stowe Maries" in Dorking, and reported on BBC South News the same day. Lengthy rights negotiations with Warners then delayed further screenings until May 2012.

From 2012 to early 2014 the film remained in limbo due to these issues. However, in early 2014, independent producer Monty Montgomery and Hamilton entered a co-production agreement to complete and release the documentary. This involved a complete re-edit of the documentary, from June 2014 to February 2015, with added material including archival interviews (Michael Powell, John Houseman, Ronald Howard and Irene Howard - all originally filmed in 1980 for the BBC's British Greats series), much historical footage and an additional interview. In addition a score was commissioned from composer Maria Antal and considerable post-production sweetening was undertaken on the original material.

This new version, of  Leslie Howard: The Man Who Gave a Damn was screened as a "work in progress" at the San Francisco Mostly British Film Festival on 14 February 2015, with Hamilton, Tracy Jenkins and Derek Partridge in attendance. The film won the award for Best Documentary Film.

Subsequent screenings (with minor changes to the commentary) took place at the Chichester International Film Festival on 18 August 2015 at the Regent Street Cinema, London in December 2015 and at the Margaret Mitchell Museum in Atlanta in May 2016 as part of the Britweek Atlanta launch.

Leslie Howard: The Man Who Gave a Damn had its world premiere broadcast on Talking Pictures TV on 27 December 2017, followed by the US TV premiere on Turner Classic Movies on 4 June 2018, which opened a month-long tribute to Howard's films. It airs regularly on Talking Pictures TV and occasionally on Turner Classic Movies.

Complete filmography

Theatre credits

Radio career
Howard was not only an accomplished actor on stage and screen, he appeared many times on radio as well. Howard began his career on radio in the early 1930s when he performed dramatic readings for The Yardley Program. Not much is known about the programme because the recordings have been lost, but references to the show can be found in fan magazines of the time and the show is listed in The New York Times radio programme guide. Howard was also a guest performer on such shows as The Rudy Vallee Show/Fleischmann's Yeast Hour, Lux Radio Theatre, The Silver Theatre, The Magic Key of RCA, Your Hit Parade and Kraft Music Hall with Bing Crosby.

In May, 1935, Leslie Howard and his daughter, Leslie Ruth Howard, aged 10, appeared on The Rudy Vallee Show/Fleischmann's Yeast Hour in "The Enchanted Forest" scene from James M. Barrie's Dear Brutus. The show was so popular with audiences that for the first time in the show's history an encore was performed six weeks later on 27 June 1935. That show survives and can be heard on the Old Time Radio Library's website.

At the end of 1936 Howard began appearing as a guest on Eddie Cantor's Texaco Town. It took six months and three appearances before he and Cantor finally delivered the punchline in the skit "Three Pairs of Rubbers." Howard's appearances were not limited to guest spots. Beginning in October 1935 and into the spring of 1936 Howard had his own show on CBS. It was a serial titled The Amateur Gentleman. The show eventually became Leslie Howard's Matinee with each week bringing a new adapted play popular at the time to radio listeners. Howard also appeared in Columbia Presents Shakespeare as Benedick in the play Much Ado About Nothing with Rosalind Russell in the summer of 1937. Howard produced two shows for Lux Radio Theatre: Lady for A Day, starring May Robson and Guy Kibbee, and The Life of Emile Zola, starring Paul Muni and Josephine Hutchinson.

His last known radio appearance in the United States before returning to Britain to help with the war effort was the Radio Tribute to the King and Queen in which dozens of British stars performed skits while King King George VI and Queen Elizabeth listened with President Roosevelt and Mrs. Roosevelt from Hyde Park. Howard's appearances on the BBC's Britain Speaks were broadcast to the United States from 16 July 1940, after the onset of the Second World War, urging America to enter the war in support of Britain. By January 1941 Howard had completed 27 broadcasts of Britain Speaks. Howard also appeared on a panel programme for the BBC called The Brains Trust.

Unfortunately, most of Howard's radio broadcasts have been lost, but a few have survived for the enjoyment of audiences today.

Radio credits

Influence 
The late Hongkongese singer and actor, Leslie Cheung(Chinese: 張國榮), adopted Leslie as his first name out of his admiration of Howard.

See also

References

Notes

Bibliography

 Burns, Jimmy. Papa Spy: Love, Faith and Betrayal in Wartime Spain. London: Bloomsbury Publishing PLC, 2009. .
 Churchill, Winston S. The Hinge of Fate.  New York: Houghton-Mifflin, 1950.
 Colvin Ian. Admiral Canaris: Chief of Intelligence. London: Colvin Press, 2007. .
 Colvin Ian. Flight 777: The Mystery of Leslie Howard. London: Evans Brothers, 1957.
 Covington, Howard E., Jr. Lady on the Hill: How Biltmore Estate Became an American Icon. Hoboken, New Jersey: Wiley, 2006. .
 Eforgan, Estel.  Leslie Howard: The Lost Actor. London: Vallentine Mitchell Publishers, 2010. .
 Goss, Chris. Bloody Biscay: The Story of the Luftwaffe's Only Long Range Maritime Fighter Unit, V Gruppe/Kampfgeschwader 40, and Its Adversaries 1942–1944. London: Crécy Publishing, 2001. .
 Howard, Leslie, ed. with Ronald Howard.  Trivial Fond Records.  London: William Kimber & Co Ltd, 1982. .
 Howard, Leslie Ruth. A Quite Remarkable Father: A Biography of Leslie Howard. New York: Harcourt Brace and Co., 1959.
 Howard, Ronald. In Search of My Father: A Portrait of Leslie Howard. London: St. Martin's Press, 1984. .
 Macdonald, Bill. The True Intrepid: Sir William Stephenson and the Unknown Agents. Vancouver, BC: Raincoast Books 2002, .
 Noble, Peter, ed. British Film Yearbook for 1945. London: The British Broadcasting Corporation, 1945.
 Rey Ximena, José. El Vuolo de Ibis [The Flight of the Ibis] . Madrid: Facta Ediciones SL, 2008. .
 Rosevink, Ben and Lt Col Herbert Hintze. "Flight 777" .FlyPast, Issue #120, July 1991.
 Sklar, Robert. City Boys: Cagney, Bogart, Garfield. Princeton, New Jersey: Princeton University Press, 1992.  .
 Smith, Joseph B. Portrait of a Cold Warrior. New York: Random House, 1976. .
 Southall, Ivan. They Shall Not Pass Unseen. London: Angus and Robertson, 1956.
 Stevenson, William. A Man Called Intrepid: The Incredible World War II Narrative of the Hero Whose Spy Network and Secret Diplomacy Changed the Course of History. Guilford, Delaware: Lyons Press, 1976, reissued in 2000. .
 Verrier, Anthony. Assassination in Algiers: Churchill, Roosevelt, De Gaulle, and the Murder of Admiral Darlan. New York: W. W. Norton and Company, Inc., 1st edition, 1991. .

External links

 
 
 
 
 Van Neste, Dan."Leslie Howard: Unmasking the Pimpernel"
 Leslie Howard at Virtual History
 Leslie Howard: The Man Who Gave A Damn (2015) by Repo Films

1893 births
1943 deaths
20th-century English male actors
Mass murder victims
British Army personnel of World War I
British civilians killed in World War II
English people of German-Jewish descent
English people of Hungarian-Jewish descent
English male film actors
English male screenwriters
English film directors
English film producers
English male silent film actors
English male stage actors
Jewish English male actors
Male actors from Kent
Northamptonshire Yeomanry officers
People educated at Alleyn's School
People educated at Dulwich College
People from Forest Hill, London
Victims of aviation accidents or incidents in international waters
Victims of aviation accidents or incidents in 1943
Victims of aircraft shootdowns
Volpi Cup for Best Actor winners
People lost at sea
20th-century English screenwriters
20th-century English male writers
20th-century English businesspeople